Armis E. Hawkins (November 11, 1920 – February 28, 2006) was an American judge who served as a justice of the Supreme Court of Mississippi from 1980 to 1995.

Life
He lived in Houston, Mississippi and graduated from its high school. He married and had three daughters.

Legacy
A section of road was named in his honor.

See also
List of justices of the Supreme Court of Mississippi

References

Chief Justices of the Mississippi Supreme Court
1920 births
2006 deaths
People from Chickasaw County, Mississippi
20th-century American judges